ASP may refer to:

Combat
 ASP pistol
 ASP, Inc., law enforcement weapon manufacturer
 A type of extending baton
 Ammunition Supply Point, military storage facility for live ammunition and explosives

Computing
 Active Server Pages, a web-scripting interface by Microsoft
 ASP.NET, a web-application framework by Microsoft
 Advanced Simple Profile, an MPEG-4 video codec profile
 Answer set programming, a declarative programming paradigm
 Application service provider, to customers over a network
 AppleTalk Session Protocol
 Association of Software Professionals
 Attached Support Processor, IBM hardware system
 Auxiliary storage pool, a feature of the IBM operating system

Education
 American School of Paris
 Jan Matejko Academy of Fine Arts, Kraków, Poland

Electronics
 Audio Signal Processor, large-scale digital signal processor
 Anti-skip protection or electronic skip protection in CD playback
 Angle-sensitive pixel, a light sensor

Entertainment
 ASP (band), a German gothic metal band
 ASP (Japanese group), Japanese idol girl group
 Adult service provider (disambiguation)
 Apparent Sensory Perception, a thought recording and reproduction device in William Gibson's fiction

Medicine and biology
 Aspartic acid, α-amino acid used in the biosynthesis of proteins
 Acylation stimulating protein
 American Society for Photobiology
 Amnesic shellfish poisoning
 Complement component 3, a protein in the complement system
 Antimicrobial stewardship, effort to educate and persuade prescribers of antimicrobials to follow evidence-based prescribing
 American Society of Primatologists

Politics
 Act of the Scottish Parliament
 American Solidarity Party
 Australian Sex Party
 Afro-Shirazi Party, political party in Tanzania
 Assembly for the Sovereignty of the Peoples, a political party in Bolivia
 Assembly of States Parties, the legislative body of the International Criminal Court

Other uses
 Airborne Surveillance Platform, Indian defence project
 Albany Student Press, newspaper of the University at Albany, The State University of New York
 Alice Springs Airport (IATA airport code)
 Allegany State Park
 Appalachia Service Project, for housing improvement
 Arkansas State Police
 Asociación de Scouts del Perú
 Aspatria railway station, UK, National Rail code
 Assault system pod or A.S.P., for the G.I. Joe doll
 Association of Surfing Professionals, former name of World Surf League
 Assistant superintendent of police
 Astronomical Society of the Pacific
 Authorized service provider
 Avenal State Prison in California, USA
 Average selling price of goods

See also
 ASPS (disambiguation)
 Asp (disambiguation)